The  2008–09 Moldovan "A" Division season was the 18th since its establishment.  A total of 17 teams contested the league.

Stadiums and locations

League table

References

External links
 Divizia A - Results

Moldovan Liga 1 seasons
2008–09 in Moldovan football
Moldova